The Sarajevo Clock Tower (Bosnian: Sarajevska sahat-kula) is a clock tower in Sarajevo, the capital of Bosnia and Herzegovina. The clock shows lunar time, in which the hands indicate 12 o'clock at the moment of sunset, the time of the Muslim Maghrib prayer. A caretaker sets the clock's time manually once a week.

History 
The tower was constructed by Gazi Husrev-beg, a governor of the area during the Ottoman period. The earliest known documented mention of the tower dates to the 17th century in a work by Evliya Çelebi. It was rebuilt twice, once after fire damage when the city was attacked by Eugene of Savoy in 1697, and in 1762.

In 1874 the clock was replaced by a mechanism made by Gillett & Bland of London. The previous Turkish mechanism was moved to the mosque in Vratnik.

In 1967 the clock was repaired, and the hands and numbers on all four clock faces were gilt.

National monument
In 2006 the clock tower was declared a national monument by a commission to preserve the country's heritage.

References 

Buildings and structures in Sarajevo
Clock towers
National Monuments of Bosnia and Herzegovina
Tourist attractions in Bosnia and Herzegovina
Stari Grad, Sarajevo
Baščaršija
C